Librascope was a Glendale, California, division of General Precision, Inc. (GPI). It was founded in 1937 by Lewis W. Imm to build and operate theater equipment, and acquired by General Precision in 1941.  During World War II it worked on improving aircraft load balancing.

Later, Librascope became a manufacturer of early digital computers sold in both the business and defense markets.  It hired Stan Frankel, a Manhattan Project veteran and early ENIAC programmer, to design the LGP-30 desk computer in 1956.  

In 1964 Librascope's Avionic Equipment Division at San Marcos has been shifted to the Aerospace Group, GPI as the West Coast facility of the Kearfott Division.  

Librascope was eventually purchased by Singer Corporation and moved into the manufacture of marine systems and land-based C3 (Command, Control, Communication) systems for the international defense industry. The company specialized in fire control systems for torpedoes, though they continued to work on a variety of other smaller military contracts through the 1970s.

After Singer was taken over by corporate raider Paul Bilzerian, the company was sold to Loral Space & Communications in 1992.  The division was eventually sold to Lockheed Martin and was eventually absorbed into the Lockheed Martin Federal Systems, but is now called Lockheed Martin NE&SS—Undersea Systems.

Computers 
LGP-30
LGP-21
Librascope AN/ASN-24 general purpose Airborne/Aerospace Computer Set (1958), after modification used in:
Centaur guidance computer (Librascope-3)
Lockheed C-141A Starlifter and C-130E Hercules - Digital Navigation Computer (System 605A), AN/ASN-24(V)
Atlas-Centaur Navigation Computer (GPK-33)
Digital Camera-Control System - aerial-reconnaissance camera system, AN/ASN-24(XY-1)

Librascope C141 airborne navigation computer
Librascope L90-I general purpose aerospace computer (1962)
Librascope L600 aircraft and missile guidance computer
Librascope L-2010 general purpose rugged computer (1962), portable
Librascope L3055 data processor for 473L system

References

External links
Librascope Memories, over 60 years of history, including 293 Librazette newsletters, photos, product literature, and company videos.
Air Force 473L global communications system

1937 establishments in California
1992 disestablishments in California
American companies disestablished in 1992
American companies established in 1937
Companies based in Glendale, California
Computer companies established in 1937
Computer companies disestablished in 1992
Defunct computer companies of the United States
Technology companies established in 1937
Technology companies disestablished in 1992